Marbella is a 1985 comedy-romance 'caper film' set in the Spanish coastal resort of Marbella, starring Rod Taylor and Britt Ekland.

The movie's soundtrack was primarily penned by prolific Los Angeles songwriter and film score composer Paul Chiten.

Co-starring with Taylor and Ekland were José Guardiola (who plays the gangster villain Patrick) and Emma Suárez, with whom Taylor's character, Commander, has a brief romantic fling before losing her to his younger sidekick Mario, played by Óscar Ladoire.

Other actors who appeared in the film include Francisco Rabal and Fernando Fernán Gómez. They play the roles of Juan and Herman Gomez, respectively.

References

External links

Marbella at the Rod Taylor Site

1985 films
English-language Spanish films
1980s English-language films
Films set in Málaga
1980s Spanish films